P59, P-59 or P.59 may refer to:

Aircraft 
 Bell XP-59, a proposed American fighter aircraft
 Bell P-59 Airacomet, an American jet fighter aircraft
 Partenavia P.59 Jolly, a British prototype training aircraft

Vessels 
 , a submarine of the Royal Navy
 , a patrol vessel of the Indian Navy
 , a submarine of the Polish Navy

Other uses 
 p59, an alias of GRASP55, a protein
 Papyrus 59, a biblical manuscript
 P59, a state regional road in Latvia